Alex Means Hyer (1848–1933) was an American politician and the fourth Mayor of Orlando from 1879 to 1880.

References

1848 births
1933 deaths
Mayors of Orlando, Florida